Diaulula cerebralis is a species of sea slug or dorid nudibranch, a marine gastropod mollusk in the family Discodorididae.

Distribution

Description

Ecology

References

Discodorididae
Gastropods described in 2001